FC Carl Zeiss Jena is a German football club based in Jena, Thuringia. Formed in 1903 and initially associated with the Carl Zeiss AG factory, they were one of the strongest clubs in East Germany from the 1960s to the 1980s, winning the DDR-Oberliga and the FDGB-Pokal three times each and reaching the 1981 European Cup Winners' Cup Final. Since German reunification in 1990, the club have competed no higher than the second tier. In the 2021–22 season, Jena played in the Regionalliga Nordost.

History
The club was founded in May 1903 by workers at the Carl Zeiss AG optics factory as the company-sponsored Fussball-Club der Firma Carl Zeiss. The club underwent name changes in 1911 to Fussball Club Carl Zeiss Jena e.V. and in March 1917 to 1. Sportverein Jena e.V.

The 1930s and World War II
In 1933, 1. SV Jena joined the Gauliga Mitte, one of 16 top-flight divisions formed in the reorganization of German football under the Third Reich. The team captured division titles in 1935, 1936, 1940, and 1941. This earned Jena entry to the national finals, but they performed poorly and were never able to advance out of preliminary-round group play. After the 1943–44 season, the Gauliga Mitte broke up into a collection of city-based leagues as World War II overtook the area.

Postwar in East Germany

In the immediate aftermath of the war, associations of all types (including sports and football clubs) were banned in Germany by the occupying Allied authorities. Jena was reconstituted in June 1946 as SG Ernst Abbe Jena and, like many other clubs in East Germany, underwent a number of name changes: SG Stadion Jena (October 1948), SG Carl Zeiss Jena (March 1949), BSG Mechanik Jena (January 1951), BSG Motor Jena (May 1951) and SC Motor Jena (November 1954).

In the aftermath of World War II, East German authorities tagged sports teams with the names of socialist heroes: Ernst Abbe was a local son and physicist associated with the Zeiss optical factory. He made an early contribution to easing the plight of workers by introducing the 8-hour work day at the Zeiss plant, a milestone for labour during the late 19th century.

In 1950 the club became a founding member of the DDR Liga (II), and in their second season captured a divisional title to win promotion to the top-flight DDR Oberliga for a single-season appearance. Renamed SC Motor Jena in 1954, they played their way back to the upper league by 1957. Jena won its first honours with the capture of the FDGB-Pokal in 1960 and followed up with the East German national title in 1963. The club was "re-founded" as FC Carl Zeiss Jena in January 1966, and became one of East Germany's "focus centres" for the development of players for the national side and a dominant side in the DDR-Oberliga. They took two more national titles in 1968 and 1970, but finished in second place another half-dozen times to sides such as Vorwärts Berlin, Dynamo Dresden and 1. FC Magdeburg. They also captured East German Cups in 1972, 1974 and 1980, and appeared in the 1981 European Cup Winners' Cup Final, losing 2–1 to Dinamo Tbilisi.

German reunification
After German reunification in 1990, Jena entered the 2. Bundesliga. Their second-place finish in 1992 deteriorated into a 17th-place finish in 1994 and relegation to Regionalliga Nordost (III). They won immediate promotion, and played for three more years at tier-II level. Since 1999 the team has primarily played tier III and IV football, but a second place-finish in the Regionalliga Nord secured Jena promotion to the 2. Bundesliga for the 2006–07 season. Jena remained in the 2. Bundesliga by winning 2–1 away against FC Augsburg in their final match of the season. They finished last in the 2. Bundesliga in 2007–08, returning to the third tier. However, this would not be one of the Regionalligen; the German Football Association (DFB) launched the new 3. Liga for 2008–09, of which Jena was a charter member.

On 9 November 2009 chairman Peter Schreiber announced his retirement; on 13 November the executive board accepted his resignation, and on 25 November Hartmut Bayer became the new chairman. The second team was involved in the 2009 European football betting scandal, accused of match-fixing in the game against ZFC Meuselwitz. On 10 December 2009 the club announced that it was in financial distress, owing over €1 million. In January 2010 the players agreed to accept a lower salary.

Carl Zeiss Jena were relegated from the 3. Liga in 2012 and finished second in the tier four Regionalliga Nordost in 2013, and third in 2014. In the 2016–17 season they won the Regionalliga Nordost and were promoted to 3. Liga after a play-off win against Viktoria Köln. CZ Jena won the first match in Köln 3–2 and lost the second leg 1–0 at home, but were promoted on the away goals rule. After three seasons in the 3. Liga, the club experienced an underwhelming season and was relegated to the Regionalliga Nordost in June 2020.

Supporters
Carl Zeiss Jena supporters have a friendship with the Welsh side Newport County, after the two sides played against each other in the European Cup Winners' Cup in the early 1980s. As with Carl Zeiss Jena, Newport County have seen similar struggles off and on the pitch, and the teams regularly play each other during pre-season.

The club compete in a Thuringia derby with Rot-Weiß Erfurt, which often features violence between the two sets of supporters and use of pyrotechnics. The rivalry is exacerbated by a mutual antipathy between the cities of Jena and Erfurt.

Honours

League
Top tier
DDR-Oberliga (East German Championship)
Winners: 1963, 1968, 1970
Runner-up: 1958, 1965, 1966, 1969, 1971, 1973, 1974, 1975, 1981
Third placed: 1977, 1979, 1980, 1983, 1986

Lower tiers
Regionalliga Nordost
Winners: 1995, 2017
Regionalliga Nord
Runner-up: 2006
NOFV-Oberliga Süd
Winner: 2005
Runner-up: 2003, 2004
Third place: 2002

Cup
FDGB Cup (East German Cup)
Winners: 1960, 1972, 1974, 1980
Olympia-Pokal (de)
Winners: 1964

Regional
Gauliga Mitte
Winners: 1935, 1936, 1940, 1941
Runners-up: 1939, 1942
Thuringian Cup (Tiers III-VII)
Winners: 1993, 1995, 1999, 2004, 2006, 2012, 2014, 2015, 2016, 2018, 2020, 2021, 2022
Runner-up: 2001, 2002, 2003, 2005, 2009

Continental
UEFA Cup Winners' Cup
Runners-up: 1981

Youth
German U-17 Championship
Runner-up: 1993

Players

Current squad

Out on loan

Notable players

FCC sent 33 players to the DDR (East German) national side.

Before the end of World War II, Jena sent three players to the German national side: Willy Krauß (1911–12), Heinz Werner (1935) and Ludwig Gärtner (1939–41).

American defender, Brian Bliss, played at the club from 1992 to 1996 and received regular calls to the United States men's national soccer team. He went on to play for MLS side Columbus Crew SC and would later serve as technical director in the club's front office.

Another notable player is former Germany goalkeeper Robert Enke, who started his career at the club and then went on to play for clubs such as Hannover 96, FC Barcelona and S.L. Benfica.

Staff

 Lukas Kwasniok – Head Coach
 Andreas Trautmann – Chief Executive
 Klaus Berka – President

Former head coaches
 René Klingbeil (2020)
 Rico Schmitt (2019–2020)
 Christian Fröhlich (2019)
 Lukas Kwasniok (2018–2019)
 Mark Zimmermann (2016–2018)
 Volkan Uluc (2014–2016)
 Lothar Kurbjuweit (2014)
 Andreas Zimmermann (2013–2014)
 Petrik Sander (2011–2013)
 Heiko Weber (2011)
 Wolfgang Frank (2010–2011)
 René van Eck (2009–2010)
 Marc Fascher (2009)
 René van Eck (2008–2009)
 Mark Zimmermann (interim) (2008)
 Henning Bürger (2007–2008)
 Valdas Ivanauskas (2007)
 Frank Neubarth (2007)
 Mario Röser (interim) (2006)
 Marco Lohmann (interim) (2005)
 Heiko Weber (2004–2007)
 Thomas Vogel (2004)
 Uwe Dern (interim) (2003)
 Joachim Steffens (2003–2004)
 Thomas Vogel (2002–2003)
 Frank Eulberg (2002)
 Wolfgang Sandhowe (2001–2002)
 Thomas Vogel (1999–2000)
 Thomas Gerstner (1998–1999)
 Reiner Hollmann (1997–1998)
 Frank Engel (1997)
 Eberhard Vogel (1994–1997)
 Hans Meyer (1993–1994)
 Uwe Erkenbrecher (1993)
 Reiner Hollmann (1992–1993)
 Bernd Stange (1989–1991)
 Lutz Lindemann (1991–1992)
 Hans Meyer (1971–1983)
 Georg Buschner (1958–1971)
 Heinz Pönert (1958)
 Rolf Hüfner (1958)
 Hans Warg (1955–1957)
 Helmut Petzold (1954–1955)
 Max Hofsommer (1953–1954)
 Bernhard Schipphorst (player-manager) (1953)
 Kurt Findeisen (1951–1953)
 Hans Carl (1949–1951)
 Hermann Malter (1948–1949)
 Adolph Prokoph (1940)
 Josef Pöttinger (1934–1938)
 Hermann Peter (1903–????)

Recent seasons
The recent season-by-season performance of the club:

 With the introduction of the Regionalligas in 1994 and the 3. Liga in 2008 as the new third tier, below the 2. Bundesliga, all leagues below dropped one tier.

Key

Former personnel

 Carsten Linke: Athletic 

Director (2008–2009)
 Stephan Lehmann: Team 

psychologist (2009)

 Roland Weissbarth: Marketing chief (2009)

 Peter Voß: Vice-president

 Peter Schreiber: President (1998–2009)
 Michael Meier

Jarly Lahn Chikwan

Reserve team
The club's reserve team, FC Carl Zeiss Jena II, currently plays in the tier five NOFV-Oberliga Süd. It first played at this level from 1994 to 1999, and again since 2006 with a third place in 1996 and 2010 as its best results.

The team also won the Thuringia Cup in 1993. The latter allowed the club qualification to the 1993–94 DFB-Pokal where it lost 2–0 to Bayern Munich.

See also
Works team

Notes

References

External links

Supporters Club
FC Carl Zeiss Jena wiki

 
FC
Sport in Jena
Association football clubs established in 1903
Football clubs in Germany
Football clubs in Thuringia
Football clubs in East Germany
1903 establishments in Germany
Works association football clubs in Germany
2. Bundesliga clubs
3. Liga clubs